Bejushan (also Romanized as Bejowshān and Bejūshan; also known as Bajooshin, Bajūshīn, Bedzheushan, Bejowshīn, and Bejūshīn) is a village in Ozomdel-e Shomali Rural District, in the Central District of Varzaqan County, East Azerbaijan Province, Iran. At the 2006 census, its population was 83, in 18 families.

References 

Towns and villages in Varzaqan County